Kalagi is a town in Mukono District in the Central Region of Uganda.

Location
In Kalagi, the road from Mukono forms a T-junction with the road from Kasangati to Kayunga. The coordinates of Kalagi are 0°30'18.0"N, 32°45'00.0"E (Latitude:0.5050; Longitude:32.7500).

Points of interest
The following additional points of interest lie within the town or near its edges:

 offices of Kalagi Town Council
 Kalagi central market
 Ssamba Foundation

External links
Annual Enduro Motocycle Race passes through Kalagi
The Area Around Kalagi is Rich Farmland

Photos
 Matooke on sale at a market in Kalagi

References

Populated places in Uganda
Cities in the Great Rift Valley
Mukono District